Billy Reid Holiman (February 11, 1928 – May 18, 2016) was an American pharmacist and politician. A Democrat, he served two years as a member of the Arkansas Senate before being defeated for reelection by Fay Boozman in 1994. He was named Arkansas Pharmacist of the Year in 1978 and 1985.

References

1928 births
2016 deaths
20th-century American politicians
Arkansas Democrats